Kossuth Street School is located in Haledon, Passaic County, New Jersey, United States. The schoolhouse was built in 1894 and was added to the National Register of Historic Places on April 10, 1980.

See also
National Register of Historic Places listings in Passaic County, New Jersey

References

1894 establishments in New Jersey
Defunct schools in New Jersey
Haledon, New Jersey
National Register of Historic Places in Passaic County, New Jersey
School buildings completed in 1894
School buildings on the National Register of Historic Places in New Jersey
Schools in Passaic County, New Jersey
New Jersey Register of Historic Places